The 1903 North Carolina Tar Heels football team represented the University of North Carolina in the 1903 college football season. The team captain for the 1903 season was G. Lyle Jones.

Schedule

References

North Carolina Tar Heels
North Carolina Tar Heels football seasons
Tar Heels